Marie Sara (born Marie Bourseiller; June 27, 1964) is a French bullfighter. In 1991 she was Europe's only female rejoneador (rejoneadora). Jean-Luc Godard was her godfather. 

She was born to director Antoine Bourseiller and actress Chantal Darget (born Marie Chantal Chauvet). Rosalie Varda is her paternal half-sister. Christophe Bourseiller (né Gintzburger) is her maternal half-brother.  

She will be a candidate for En Marche! in the 2017 Legislative Elections in France.

References

See also 
List of female bullfighters

Female bullfighters
French bullfighters
1964 births
Living people
Sportspeople from Boulogne-Billancourt